Deer Creek is a stream in Allen County, Kansas and Anderson County, Kansas, in the United States. It is a tributary of the Neosho River.

Deer Creek was named from an abundance of deer along its banks.

See also
List of rivers of Kansas

References

Rivers of Allen County, Kansas
Rivers of Anderson County, Kansas
Rivers of Kansas